Countrypärlor 2 is a 2012 Mona Gustafsson studio album. The album mostly consists of country cover songs, but also the own-composed song "Som ljuset på min jord", which was also released as a single in late 2011, and scored successes at the Internet-based chart Pop i topp where it stayed for 10 weeks.

Track listing
Blame it on Your Lyin' Heart
Crying Time
Yellow Roses
Tennessee Waltz
Som ljuset på min jord
Blue Eyes Crying in the Rain
If You Love Me Let Me Know
Forget Me Not
Let Your Love Flow
Your Cheatin' Heart
Every Little Thing

References 

2012 albums
Mona Gustafsson albums
Swedish-language albums